Dangerous Games (2007) is a science fiction anthology edited by American writers Jack Dann and Gardner Dozois. It was published in 2007, and includes stories on the theme of "dangerous games" that were originally published from 1958 to 2005.  It is the 35th book in their anthology series for Ace Books.

Contents
The book itself, as well as each of the stories, has a short preface by the editors.

Robert Sheckley: "The Prize of Peril" (First published in F&SF, 1958)
Cory Doctorow: "Anda's Game" (First published in Salon, 2004)
Kate Wilhelm: "Ladies and Gentlemen, This Is Your Crisis!" (First published in Orbit 18, 1976)
Alastair Reynolds: "Stroboscopic" (First published in Interzone, 1998)
Vernor Vinge: "Synthetic Serendipity" (First published in IEEE Spectrum, 2005)
Jonathan Lethem: "How We Got in Town and Out Again" (First published in Asimov's, 1996)
Gwyneth Jones: "Red Sonja and Lessingham in Dreamland" (First published in Off Limits, 1996)
William Browning Spencer: "The Halfway House at the Heart of Darkness" (First published in Lord of the Fantastic, 1998)
Allen Steele: "Her Own Private Sitcom" (First published in Analog, 1999)
Terry Dowling: "The Ichneumon and the Dormeuse" (First published in Interzone, 1996)
Jason Stoddard: "Winning Mars" (First published in Interzone, 2005)

External links 

2007 anthologies
Jack Dann and Gardner Dozois Ace anthologies
Ace Books books